"I Hear Motion" was the first single from The Pleasure of Your Company, the third studio album by Australian new wave rock band Models.

It was a Top 20 success on the Australian Kent Music Report singles chart, peaking at No. 16 for two weeks, (although it climbed higher in several states and territories, placing at No. 12 on Melbourne's 3XY charts in October 1983).

At the 1983 Countdown Music Awards, the song was nominated for Best Australian Single.

Portions of "I Hear Motion" were included in the soundtrack of the 1988 movie, Young Einstein.

Duffield claimed the genesis for writing the song was a unsuccessful attempt at playing Stevie Wonder's "Superstition" on a keyboard.

Reception
Countdown Magazine said at the time of release, ""I Hear Motion" showcases their new sound. It's sophisticated and slightly jarring, but ultimately wins you over with seductive rhythms that defy you to remain unmoved." The Sun-Herald said, "it’s no wonder the first single from the album, "I Hear Motion", with its strong catchy beat, innovative keyboards and suave vocals hit the national charts".

Track listing

Charts

Weekly charts

Year-end charts

References

External links
 "I Hear Motion" from discogs.com

1983 singles
Models (band) songs
1983 songs
Mushroom Records singles
Song recordings produced by Nick Launay